Animation World Network (often just "AWN") is an online publishing group that specializes in resources for animators, with an extensive website offering news, articles and links for professional animators and animation fans. Specifically, AWN covers animator profiles, independent film distribution, major animation studio activities, licensing, CGI and other animation technologies, as well as current events in all fields of animation.

AWN also publishes print magazines.  The magazines are Animation World, dedicated to animation in general, and VFX World, which focuses on special effects and computer-generated imagery.

History

In 1995, Ron Diamond partnered with Dan Sarto and founded the Animation World Network. A year after Toy Story debuted, Sarto and Diamond produced their first issue. "Back then there weren't many people publishing on the Internet, but we decided to go online and bypass print altogether; not just for cost reasons but because animators are always ahead of the curve when it comes to exploring new technologies," Diamond said.

References

External links
 

Internet properties established in 1996
Websites about animation
Animation magazines
Online mass media companies of the United States